The Crossroad is a 1988 Latvian documentary film directed by Ivars Seleckis.

Awards and accolades
 3rd European Film Awards
 Best Documentary - Won

References

External links
 * 

1988 documentary films
1988 films
Latvian documentary films
Soviet documentary films
European Film Awards winners (films)
Soviet-era Latvian films